Fitzmaurice is a Hiberno-Norman,  Cambro-Norman, Anglo-Norman surname. It is patronymic as the prefix   Fitz- derives from the Latin filius, meaning "son of".

According to Irish genealogist Edward MacLysaght:

 

Fitzmaurice is uncommon as a given name.

Surname
Notable people with the surname Fitzmaurice include:
 The family of the Earls of Kildare  | Earls of Kerry  | Earls of Leinster  | Earls of Desmond . Progenitors of the famous Irish family The Geraldine's
 Caroline Fitzmaurice, née Fitzgerald (1865–1911), poet, wife of Edmond Fitzmaurice, 1st Baron Fitzmaurice, socialite during The Gilded Age and La Belle Époque
 Catherine Fitzmaurice (b.?), Actress and voice specialist, taught at the Juilliard School's Drama Division, Yale School of Drama, Harvard University
 Deanne Fitzmaurice, Pulitzer Prize winning American photographer, photographed Barack Obama, Steven Spielberg and Jerry Seinfeld
 Éamonn Fitzmaurice (1977- ), Gaelic footballer, former member of the Kerry senior football team and current selector
 Edmond Fitzmaurice, 1st Baron Fitzmaurice (1846 – 1935), British Liberal politician, was Chancellor of the Duchy of Lancaster, managing the private estate of the British Royal family
 Edmond John Fitzmaurice (1881-1962), Bishop of (Catholic diocese of) Wilmington, Chancellor of the Archdiocese of Philadelphia
 George Fitzmaurice (1885 - 1940), American film director, his movies included The Son of the Sheik, Raffles, Mata Hari, and Suzy
 George Fitzmaurice (writer) (1877 - 1963), Irish dramatist and writer, works were printed in The Dublin Magazine
  Gerald FitzMaurice  , 1st Lord of Offaly. died c. 1221. 2nd eldest son of Maurice FitzGerald, Lord of Lanstephan. Built Maynooth Castle early 12th century. Progenitor of the Earls of Kildare and Earls of Leinster.
 Gerald Fitzmaurice (1901-1982), English barrister and judge, was Judge of the International Court of Justice of the United Nations, and Judge of the European Court of Human Rights
 James Fitzmaurice (1898 – 1965), Irish aviation pioneer, worked for the British in the Bremen crew, fought at the Battle of the Somme, he met Adolf Hitler in 1933 and witnessed the Reichstag fire 
 James Fitzmaurice  (died 1579), Leader of the Desmond Rebellions 1569, styled by English writers as "James Geraldine" Irish rebel.
 John Edmund Fitzmaurice (1839 – 1920), American prelate of the Roman Catholic Church, was Bishop of the Diocese of Erie in Pennsylvania 
 John Fitzmaurice (1947 - 2003), English author, became Secretary of the Brussels Labour Party and administrator for the European Commission
 John Petty Fitzmaurice  1st Earl of Shelburne,(1706-1761), known as John FitzMaurice until 1751 and as The Viscount FitzMaurice (1751-1753), was an Anglo-Irish peer and politician.
 Leo Fitzmaurice  (b. 1963), British artist, was commissioned by Harewood House and won a prize at Leeds Art Gallery 
 Lewis Roper Fitzmaurice (1816 - 1893), an explorer and surveyor aboard HMS Beagle'', for whom the Fitzmaurice River is named
 Martin Fitzmaurice (b. 1940), English darts master of ceremonies, caller, scorer and referee
 Maurice Fitzmaurice (1861 - 1924), Irish civil engineer, Chief Engineer to the London County Council, was elected fellow of the Royal Society
 Maurice Swynfen Fitzmaurice (1870 - 1927), Royal Navy officer, Vice-Admiral and Director of Naval Intelligence, his ship was sunk by a submarine
 Michael Fitzmaurice (1908-1967), American actor, best known for his portrayal of Superman
 Michael John Fitzmaurice (b. 1950), former United States Army soldier and a recipient of the Medal of Honor during the Vietnam War
 Neil Fitzmaurice, British writer and actor
Raymond Fitzmaurice, K.B.E., D.S.O., (1878 – 1943) was an officer of the Royal Navy during the First World War.
 Simon FitzMaurice, Principal Software Developer at Linguamatics
Susan Fitzmaurice (born 1959), British linguist, President of the Philological Society and Chair of English linguistics at the University of Sheffield
 Thomas FitzMaurice  Lord OConnello, 1st Baron of Kerry. died c. 1209. Eldest son of Maurice FitzGerald, Lord of Lanstephan. Built Shanid Castle early 12th century. Progenitor of the Earls of Desmond.
 William Fitzmaurice, William Petty Fitzmaurice, 2nd Earl of Shelburne, 1st Marquees of Landsdowne (1737–1805),  British Prime Minister from (1782-1783), born William Fitzmaurice
 Tom Fitzmaurice (1898 - 1977), Australian rules footballer, played at a premiership team at Geelong Football Club 
 Earls of Orkney from 1791 to 1998:
 Mary FitzMaurice, 4th Countess of Orkney (1755-1831), 4th (modern) Countess of Orkney, daughter of Murrough O'Brien, 1st Marquess of Thomond, lived at Cliveden House
 Thomas FitzMaurice, 5th Earl of Orkney (1803-1877), 5th modern Earl of Orkney, grandnephew of U.K. Prime Minister William Petty Fitzmaurice, 1st Marquess of Lansdowne
 George FitzMaurice, 6th Earl of Orkney (1827-1889), joined the 71st Highlanders Regiment as a Captain from the 92nd Regiment in 1853, and saw action in the Crimea  
 Edmond FitzMaurice (1867-1951), 7th modern Earl of Orkney
 Cecil FitzMaurice, 8th Earl of Orkney (1919-1998), 8th modern Earl of Orkney, joined the Royal Army Service Corps on the outbreak of WWII, and served in North Africa, Italy, France, Germany, and in the Korean war

See also
 Petty-Fitzmaurice, disambiguation page
 Fitzmaurice, Saskatchewan, a community in Canada
 Fitzmorris

References

Irish families
Patronymic surnames
Surnames from given names